Isaac "Saito" Nieves (born January 6, 1981 in Puerto Rico) is a Puerto Rican soccer player who currently plays midfielder for Bayamon FC of the Puerto Rico Soccer League.  Nieves played for the Puerto Rico national football team in a 2010 FIFA World Cup qualifying match.

International goals

References

External links

1982 births
Living people
Sportspeople from San Juan, Puerto Rico
Puerto Rican footballers
Puerto Rico international footballers
Puerto Rico Islanders players
USL First Division players
Sevilla FC Puerto Rico players
USL Championship players
Association football midfielders